Pseudochazara atlantis is a species of butterfly in the family Nymphalidae. It is endemic to Morocco. It flies in barren rocky slopes. The male is found only on large tabular spaces and bare mountain peaks, while the female wanders on the slopes, both for foraging the flowers of Compositae or thyme and to lay her eggs.

Flight period 
The species is univoltine, and is on wing from mid-June to early August depending on altitude and locality.

Food plants
Larvae feed on grasses.

References

Sources 
Michel Tarrier 
Tennent, John, 1996; The Butterflies of Morocco, Algeria and Tunisia;

External links
 Satyrinae of the Western Palearctic

Pseudochazara
Endemic fauna of Morocco
Butterflies of Africa
Lepidoptera of North Africa
Butterflies described in 1905